Eurobanks are financial institutions that accept deposits and make loans in foreign currencies.

 Eurobank a.d., in Serbia
 Eurobank Bulgaria AD
 Eurobank Ergasias, in Greece
 EuroBancshares, in Puerto Rico
 Euro Bank SA, in Poland
 Banque Commerciale pour l'Europe du Nord – Eurobank, in France, Russian-owned